Tapukok Lake is narrow glacial lake on the Mistik Creek chain above the Vamp Creek confluence. It is surrounded by the Churchill River Upland portion of the Midwestern Canadian Shield forests which consist of mixed deciduous and coniferous trees.

The area around the lake consists of rocky parallel ridges with poorly drained areas of muskeg and irregular stony shorelines due to intense glaciation. The lake is situated on the well known "Mistik Creek Loop", a remote canoe route  in length which can be paddled in four days.

Tapukok means 'seven' in Cree, as all of the fourteen lakes on Mistik Creek are named in numeric order in Cree.

See also
List of lakes of Manitoba

References

Lakes of Northern Manitoba
Glacial lakes of Manitoba